Sabrina Bulleri (7 January 1959 - 17 April 2000) was an Italian Paralympic athlete.

She competed at the 1984 Summer Paralympic Games, winning two bronze medals.
She competed at the 1988 Summer Paralympic Games, in Seoul. She won three gold medals, in the 100, 200 meter sprints, and in the 4 × 100 meter relay.  She won a bronze medal in the 4 × 200 meter relay.

Life 
Sabrina Bulleri began to play sports in the ASHA club in Pisa, where she trained with Soriano Ceccanti, Mariella Bertini and Santo Mangano.  All became Paralympic champions in the various disciplines.

She died, after a long illness, in April 2000, in Ghezzano. In the Natural Park of Migliarino, San Rossore, Massaciuccoli, where she had worked, an accessible path was dedicated to her, the Bulleri path.

References 

1959 births
2000 deaths
Paralympic athletes of Italy
Italian wheelchair racers
Paralympic gold medalists for Italy
Paralympic bronze medalists for Italy
Athletes (track and field) at the 1984 Summer Paralympics
Athletes (track and field) at the 1988 Summer Paralympics
Medalists at the 1984 Summer Paralympics
Medalists at the 1988 Summer Paralympics